Janet Friedman Martel (born February 26, 1943) is an American bridge player from Davis, California. A graduate of University of California, Berkeley, she is a retired attorney and a past president of the United States Bridge Federation (USBF). She is married to Chip Martel, a world champion player.  She was previously married to Lew Stansby another world champion player. Her parents Milton and Rose Friedman were both free market economists.

Martel has won seven national championships, or national-rated events at North American Bridge Championships meets. Playing under the name Jan Stansby with Pat Leary in 1974, she won the Whitehead Women's Pairs, the premier ACBL annual championship for women pairs.

She was inducted into the ACBL Hall of Fame in 2012.

Bridge accomplishments

Honors

 ACBL Hall of Fame, Blackwood Award, 2012

 ACBL Honorary Member, 2018

Wins

 North American Bridge Championships (7)
 North American Pairs (1) 1988 
 Grand National Teams (1) 2009 
 Machlin Women's Swiss Teams (1) 1986 
 Wagar Women's Knockout Teams (1) 1994 
 Sternberg Women's Board-a-Match Teams (1) 1986 
 Chicago Mixed Board-a-Match (1) 2001 
  North American Pairs Flight A (1) 1988

Runners-up

 North American Bridge Championships (7)
 Whitehead Women's Pairs (1) 1988 
 Grand National Teams (1) 2006 
 Machlin Women's Swiss Teams (1) 1996 
 Wagar Women's Knockout Teams (3) 1980, 1985, 1987 
 Chicago Mixed Board-a-Match (1) 2004

Notes

References

External links
  – with video interview
 
  ACBL NABC Database - Jan Martel

1943 births
American contract bridge players
20th-century American lawyers
University of California, Berkeley alumni
People from Davis, California
Living people
Place of birth missing (living people)
Date of birth missing (living people)